The canton of Berck is a canton situated in the Pas-de-Calais département and in the Hauts-de-France region of France.

Geography 
The canton surrounds the town of Berck in the arrondissement of Montreuil.

Composition 
At the French canton reorganisation which came into effect in March 2015, the canton was expanded from 10 to 31 communes:

Airon-Notre-Dame
Airon-Saint-Vaast
Attin
Beaumerie-Saint-Martin
Berck
Bernieulles
Beutin
La Calotterie
Campigneulles-les-Grandes
Campigneulles-les-Petites
Colline-Beaumont
Conchil-le-Temple
Écuires
Estrée
Estréelles
Groffliers
Hubersent
Inxent
Lépine
La Madelaine-sous-Montreuil
Montcavrel
Montreuil
Nempont-Saint-Firmin
Neuville-sous-Montreuil
Rang-du-Fliers
Recques-sur-Course
Sorrus
Tigny-Noyelle
Verton
Waben  
Wailly-Beaucamp

Canton Population

See also 
 Cantons of Pas-de-Calais
 Communes of Pas-de-Calais

References

Berck